Order of Bethlehem Is one of order of the State of Palestine.

Grades	
The Grand Collar of Bethlehem: is the highest level in this Order, it is given to presidents, kings and high-ranking clerics.

The Star of Bethlehem: is a distinctive level in this Order, and it is given to ministers, ambassadors and politicians, Palestinians and foreigners.

Recipients

The Grand Collar of Bethlehem
Patriarch Kirill of Moscow (2012).

See also
Orders, decorations, and medals of the State of Palestine
Grand Collar of the State of Palestine

References

Orders, decorations, and medals of the State of Palestine